Sir Gerard William Vanneck, 2nd Baronet (12 September 1743 – 23 May 1791) was a British merchant and Member of Parliament.

Vanneck was the eldest son of Sir Joshua Vanneck, 1st Baronet, and his wife, Mary Anne Daubuz. His father was a successful London merchant who had emigrated to Great Britain from the Netherlands in 1722.

He was elected to the House of Commons for Dunwich in 1768, a seat he held until 1790. In 1777 he succeeded his father as second Baronet and promptly commissioned the building of Heveningham Hall in Suffolk.

Vanneck died, unmarried, in May 1791 and was succeeded in the baronetcy by his younger brother Joshua, who was elevated to the peerage as Baron Huntingfield in 1796.

References

1743 births
1791 deaths
Baronets in the Baronetage of Great Britain
Members of the Parliament of Great Britain for English constituencies
English people of Dutch descent
British MPs 1768–1774
British MPs 1774–1780
British MPs 1780–1784
British MPs 1784–1790
Gerard